Miss Universe Puerto Rico 2022 was the 66th edition of the Miss Universe Puerto Rico beauty pageant. At the end of the event, Michelle Colón of Loíza crowned Ashley Cariño of Fajardo as her successor. Cariño will represent Puerto Rico at Miss Universe 2022.

Results

Placements

Special awards

Contestants
28 contestants competed for the title:

Judges

Preliminary
Luz Nereida Vélez – News anchor and journalist
Vivian Santiago – Lawyer and businesswoman
Carlos Izcoa – Oral rehabilitation specialist
Ana Teresa Toro – Journalist, writer, and columnist
Germán Legarreta – Executive producer and casting director
Frances Ríos – Businesswoman and founder of Woman Who Lead
Eli Cay – Model, actor, and entertainer

Final
Melina León – Singer and actress
Yolandita Monge – Singer
Jeimy Osorio – Actress
Byankah Sobá – Journalist
Ada Monzon – Meteorologist
Mariana Vicente – Miss Puerto Rico Universe 2010 from Río Grande
Joe Bonilla – Artist manager and publicist
Luis Ortiz Espinoza – Dermatologist
Carlos M. Portocarrero – Plastic surgeon

Crossovers 
 Miss USA
 2021: Fajardo – Ashley Ann Cariño Barreto (as Miss Florida USA; 2nd Runner-Up)

 Miss World Puerto Rico
 2021: San Juan – Raishmar Carrillo González (as Miss Río Grande World; 3rd Runner-Up)

See also

References

Beauty pageants in Puerto Rico
2022 beauty pageants
2022 in Puerto Rico